Piz Lagalb is a mountain of the Livigno Alps, overlooking the Bernina Pass in the canton of located in Graubünden. In winter it serves as a ski area.

See also
 List of mountains of the Alps
 List of mountains of Switzerland accessible by public transport

References

External links
 Piz Lagalb on Hikr

Mountains of the Alps
Mountains of Switzerland
Mountains of Graubünden
Two-thousanders of Switzerland
Pontresina